Tunstall Town Hall is a municipal building in the High Street in Tunstall, Staffordshire, England. The structure, which was the meeting place of Tunstall Urban District Council, is a Grade II listed building.

History
The first town hall in Tunstall was a small neoclassical style town hall in the middle of Tower Square which was completed in 1816. After the first town hall became inadequate, the local board of health decided to procure a more substantial structure: the site chosen was the western end of the market hall, which had itself been designed by George Thomas Robinson in the neoclassical style and completed in 1855. The market hall had to be reduced in size to accommodate the new town hall.

The new building was designed by Absalom Wood in the Renaissance style, built in red brick with terracotta dressings at a cost of £14,000 and completed in 1885. The design involved a symmetrical main frontage with nine bays facing onto the High Street; the central section of five bays, which slightly projected forward, featured arched openings on the ground floor, to allow access to shops and to the market hall, the central opening being flanked by brackets supporting a balcony. There were round headed windows on the first floor flanked by Corinthian order pilasters supporting an entablature bearing the inscription "Peace, Happiness, Truth, Justice AD MDCCCLXXXV" and a heavily modillioned cornice. The central bay featured an attic floor with an oculus containing a Star of David flanked by pilasters supporting an open pediment; the outer bays in the central section were also pedimented. Internally, the principal rooms were the central hall, the courtroom and the council chamber.

Following significant population growth, largely associated with ceramic production, Tunstall became an urban district with the new town hall as its headquarters in 1894. The building continued to serve in that capacity into the early 20th century but ceased to be the local seat of government when the Federation of Stoke-on-Trent was formed in March 1910. The ground floor of the building continued to be used for retail purposes while the first floor was used as an events venue: performers included the punk rock band, Crass, in April 1982 and the punk rock band, Discharge, in July 1983. However, the building was neglected and fell into a state of serious state of disrepair in the 1990s.

An extensive programme of restoration works, being undertaken by G. F. Tomlinson at a cost of £3.8 million, commenced in June 2019. The works were intended to enable the building to host the local library, a children's centre and a local community hub.

Notes

References

Government buildings completed in 1885
City and town halls in Staffordshire
Buildings and structures in Stoke-on-Trent
Grade II listed buildings in Staffordshire